Pom Alexandra Klementieff (born 3 May 1986) is a French actress. She was trained at the Cours Florent drama school in Paris and appeared in such French films as The Easy Way (2008) and Sleepless Night (2011), before making her American film debut in Oldboy (2013).

Klementieff received worldwide recognition for her role as Mantis in the Marvel Cinematic Universe films Guardians of the Galaxy Vol. 2 (2017), Avengers: Infinity War (2018), Avengers: Endgame (2019), Thor: Love and Thunder (2022) and the television film The Guardians of the Galaxy Holiday Special (2022). She will reprise the role in the upcoming film Guardians of the Galaxy Vol. 3 (2023).

Early life
Klementieff was born in Quebec City, Quebec, Canada to a Korean mother and Russian-French father Alexis Klementieff, who was working there as a consul with the government of France. She is a French citizen, but does not have Canadian citizenship because jus soli does not apply to children of diplomats. Her grandfather was Russian painter Eugene Klementieff (1901-c.1985). Her parents chose the name "Pom" because it is similar in pronunciation to the Korean words for both "spring" and "tiger". Klementieff lived in Canada for one year before her family began travelling extensively due to her father's job. They lived in Japan and Ivory Coast before settling in France.

Klementieff's father died of cancer when she was five, and her mother had schizophrenia and was unable to care for children, so Klementieff was raised by her paternal uncle and aunt. Her uncle, whom she described as "like [her] second father", died on her 18th birthday, and her older brother Namou died by suicide seven years later, on her 25th birthday. Klementieff briefly studied law in an undergraduate capacity after her uncle's death to appease her aunt, but did not find it appealing. She also worked as a waitress and saleswoman in France. She started acting at age 19 at the Cours Florent drama school in Paris. A few months into her education, she won a theatre competition and two years of free classes with the school's top teachers.

Career

2007–2012: Early career

Klementieff's first professional acting job was the French independent film Après lui (2007), portraying the stepdaughter of the protagonist played by Catherine Deneuve. Filming for her scenes took three days. In one scene, Klementieff was supposed to push someone down a set of stairs but accidentally fell down the stairs herself, and director Gaël Morel kept that shot in the final film. 

Her first leading role was in Loup (2009), a French film about a tribe of reindeer herders in the Siberian mountains. During filming, Klementieff stayed in a camp, hours from the nearest village, where temperatures dropped well below zero. She befriended nomads who lived there, worked with real wolves, rode reindeer, and swam with a horse in a lake.

2013–present: Breakthrough
Klementieff made her Hollywood debut in Spike Lee's Oldboy (2013), a remake of the South Korean film of the same name. She portrayed Haeng-bok, the bodyguard of the antagonist played by Sharlto Copley. A fan of the original film, Klementieff heard about the part through Roy Lee, a producer with the remake, and took boxing lessons after learning the role involved martial arts. After showcasing her boxing skills during her audition, Lee asked her to go home and come back wearing a more feminine outfit and make-up, like her character in the film. She contributed some of her own clothes to the character's wardrobe, and trained three hours a day for two months for an on-screen fight with star Josh Brolin. Klementieff came up with the name Haeng-bok, Korean for "happiness", herself after Lee asked her to research possible names for the character.

Klementieff moved to Los Angeles after Oldboy was filmed and began pursuing more Hollywood auditions. She continued taekwondo after the film, and has a purple belt as of the summer of 2014. Her next acting role was the film Hacker's Game (2015), in which she plays a hacker she compared to Lisbeth Salander from the novel The Girl with the Dragon Tattoo. Klementieff used her boxing skills again in the film, and due to the movie's low budget, she had to do her own make-up and choose her own wardrobe. It was her idea to dye her hair purple for the role, to which the directors first objected but later acquiesced. In 2017, she appeared in the romance drama Newness and the black comedy-drama Ingrid Goes West.

Klementieff received worldwide recognition when she joined the Marvel Cinematic Universe as Mantis, appearing in the films Guardians of the Galaxy Vol. 2 (2017), Avengers: Infinity War (2018), and Avengers: Endgame (2019). In 2019, she appeared in an episode of the Netflix science fiction anthology series Black Mirror, the thriller film Uncut Gems, and had voice roles in the animated supernatural comedy film The Addams Family. In 2020, she had a recurring role as Martel in the HBO science fiction series Westworld. She is set to reprise her role as Mantis in the 2023 sequel Guardians of the Galaxy Vol. 3, as well as appearing in the upcoming Mission: Impossible – Dead Reckoning Part One and Mission: Impossible – Dead Reckoning Part Two in 2023 and 2024, respectively.

Filmography

Film

Television

Theme park attractions

Notes

References

External links

 
 

1986 births
21st-century French actresses
Actresses from Quebec City
Cours Florent alumni
French expatriate actresses in the United States
French expatriates in Ivory Coast
French expatriates in Japan
French film actresses
French people of Korean descent
French people of Russian descent
French television actresses
Living people